Phenanthridine is a nitrogen heterocyclic compound that is the basis of DNA-binding fluorescent dyes through intercalation. Examples of such dyes are ethidium bromide and propidium iodide. It is an isomer of acridine.

Phenanthridine was discovered by Amé Pictet and H. J. Ankersmit in 1891 by pyrolysis of the condensation product of benzaldehyde and aniline. In the Pictet–Hubert reaction (1899)  the compound is formed in a reaction of the 2-aminobiphenyl – formaldehyde adduct (an N-acyl-o-xenylamine) with zinc chloride at elevated temperatures.

The reaction conditions for the Pictet–Hubert reaction were improved by Morgan and Walls in 1931, replacing the metal by phosphorus oxychloride and using nitrobenzene as a reaction solvent. For this reason, the reaction is also called the Morgan–Walls reaction. 

The reaction is similar to the Bischler–Napieralski reaction and the Pictet–Spengler reaction.

References

DNA-binding substances